Rebecca Makkai (born April 20, 1978) is an American novelist and short-story writer.

Biography
Makkai grew up in Lake Bluff, Illinois. Her paternal grandmother, was a well-known actress and novelist in Hungary. Makkai graduated from Lake Forest Academy and attended Washington and Lee University where she graduated with a B.A. in English. She later earned a master's degree from Middlebury College's Bread Loaf School of English.

Makkai has taught at the Iowa Writers' Workshop and is on the MFA faculties of Sierra Nevada University and Northwestern University. She is the artistic director of StoryStudio Chicago. Makkai has also taught at Lake Forest College and held the Mackey Chair in Creative Writing Beloit College.

She has two children and lives in Lake Forest, Illinois. She met her husband, Jon Freeman, at Bread Loaf.

Career
Makkai's debut novel, The Borrower, was released in June 2011. It was a Booklist Top Ten Debut, an Indie Next pick, an O Magazine selection, and one of Chicago Magazine's choices for best fiction of 2011. It was translated into seven languages. 

Her second novel, The Hundred-Year House, is set in the Northern suburbs of Chicago, and was published by Viking/Penguin in July 2014. It received starred reviews in Booklist, Publishers Weekly and Library Journal. The book won the 2015 Novel of the Year award from the Chicago Writers Association and was named a best book of 2014 by BookPage. 

Makkai's third novel, titled The Great Believers, is set during the AIDS epidemic in 1980s Chicago and was published by Viking/Penguin Random House in June 2018. The Great Believers won the 2019 Andrew Carnegie Medal for Excellence in Fiction and was a finalist for the 2018 National Book Award for Fiction. It was also a finalist for the 2019 Pulitzer Prize in Fiction, and won the LA Times Book Prize, the ALA Stonewall Award, and the Chicago Review of Books Award.

Makkai's debut short story collection, Music for Wartime, was published by Viking in June 2015. A starred and featured review in Publishers Weekly said, "Though these stories alternate in time between WWII and the present day, they all are set, as described in the story "Exposition", within "the borders of the human heart"—a terrain that their author maps uncommonly well." The Kansas City Star wrote that "if any short story writer can be considered a rock star of the genre, it's Rebecca Makkai."

Her short stories have been anthologized in The Best American Short Stories 2008, 2009, 2010, and 2011 and as well as in The Best American Nonrequired Reading 2009 and 2016; she received a 2017 Pushcart Prize, a 2014 NEA fellowship, and a 2022 Guggenheim Foundation Fellowship. Makkai's fiction has also appeared in Ploughshares, Tin House, The Threepenny Review, New England Review, and Shenandoah. Her nonfiction has appeared in Harpers, Salon.com, and The New Yorker website. Makkai's stories have also been featured on Public Radio International's Selected Shorts and This American Life.

Bibliography

Novels
 The Borrower, Viking (2011)
 The Hundred-Year House, Viking (2014)
 The Great Believers, Viking (2018)
 I Have Some Questions for You, Viking (2023)

Short story collections
 Music for Wartime, Viking (June 2015)

References

External links
 REVIEW : The Hundred Year House by Rebecca Makkai at Upcoming4.me

1978 births
Living people
21st-century American novelists
American short story writers
American women novelists
American people of Hungarian descent
Writers from Chicago
Lake Forest Academy alumni
Washington and Lee University alumni
Middlebury College alumni
21st-century American women writers
People from Lake Bluff, Illinois
Novelists from Illinois
People from Lake Forest, Illinois
Stonewall Book Award winners